Saint-Herménégilde is a municipality in Quebec.

Demographics

Population
Population trend:

References

Municipalities in Quebec
Designated places in Quebec
Incorporated places in Estrie
Coaticook Regional County Municipality